First Interstate Tower is a name that was carried by several bank buildings of the former First Interstate Bancorp, in the United States, and may refer to:

 Aon Center (Los Angeles), California, formerly named First Interstate Tower
 Wells Fargo Center (Portland, Oregon), formerly named First Interstate Tower
 Fountain Place, in Dallas, Texas, formerly named First Interstate Tower
 621 17th Street, in Denver, Colorado, formerly named First Interstate Tower South
 633 17th Street, in Denver, Colorado, formerly named First Interstate Tower North

See also
 First Interstate Tower fire
 First Interstate Center (disambiguation)